The British Plant Gall Society is a voluntary organisation which encourages cecidology, the study of plant galls, in the British Isles. It was formed in 1985. Its biannual journal, Cecidology, is edited by Michael Chinery.

Notable people 
 Michael Chinery
 Margaret Hutchinson

Publications

References

External links 
 
 

 
1985 establishments in the United Kingdom
British naturalists
Environmental organizations established in 1985
Flora of the British Isles
Learned societies of the United Kingdom
Natural history of the United Kingdom